Leptarthrus is a genus of robber-flies, Most species are found throughout Europe, and there is one Chinese species.

References
Key to Leptarthrus species Milan HRADSKÝ & Fritz GELLER-GRIMM (1997) [Published in: Mitteilungen des Internationalen Vereins 22(1/2): 11-14; Frankfurt a.M.]

Asilidae genera
Asilomorph flies of Europe